Diana Bathing or Diana Getting out of her Bath is an oil-on-canvas painting by French artist François Boucher, created in 1742. It depicts the Roman goddess Diana, with a nymph as her companion. The painting was acquired in 1852 by the Louvre, in Paris.

Description
The painting depicts in the foreground, the naked goddess Diana, having just coming out from her bath, with a female companion. Diana is recognizable by the crown of pearls that she wears, with a crescent-shaped jewel, and is in the company of a nymph kneeling at her feet.

The goddess is nude, sitting on silks that enhance her fair complexion and blonde hair; the nymph, to her right, and left of the canvas, has dark hair, and observes the legs of the goddess. The bright skin tones acquire reddish reflections, in contrast to the bluish green of the landscape. 

The fact that the naked woman represented is the goddess of hunting is evidenced by her attributes, such as the quiver with the arrows, the two hunting dogs, and some prey. Diana sits on a silk fabric that symbolizes luxury and contrasts with the rural hinterland. Among the hunted animals there are two doves – symbols of love – which were often an attribute of Venice. Boucher used a similar motif in his work representing Venus Consoling Love. On the left there are two dogs, one drinks water from the pond where the goddess has just emerged, while the other turns his head.

References

1742 paintings
Paintings in the Louvre by French artists
Paintings depicting Diana (mythology)
Mythological paintings by François Boucher
Dogs in art